Riccardo Tantardini (born 6 May 1993) is a former Italian football defender.

Club career
On 3 June 2019, his club FeralpiSalò announced that he will have to retire from playing due to recurring injuries and will start working for his father's carpentry company in his hometown of Lecco.

References

External links

1993 births
Living people
Italian footballers
Sportspeople from Lecco
Association football defenders
Atalanta B.C. players
FeralpiSalò players
Serie C players
Footballers from Lombardy